Jose "Joey" Javier Reyes (born October 21, 1954) is a Filipino professor, writer, director, miscellaneous crew and actor. He has won awards at the Gawad Urian, Metro Manila Film Festival and Filipino Star Awards for Movies for his films, which include Pahiram ng Isang Umaga, Batang PX and Kasal, Kasali, Kasalo. He also wrote the screenplay for Filipino blockbuster Four Sisters and a Wedding from which a Filipino meme featuring Bea Alonzo was sourced.

Education
Joey Reyes graduated from De La Salle University in Manila, Philippines from the College of Liberal Arts. During his stay as an undergraduate he was already a director and writer for the university's theatre guild - Harlequin Theatre Guild.  Reyes also finished his Masters Degree in English Education from the De la Salle University Graduate School and has taken courses leading to his Ph.D. in Comparative Literature at the University of Santo Tomas.  He was the recipient of a Doctoral Enrichment Program grant through the Fulbright-Hayes Foundation where he took doctoral courses in Comparative Literature and Folklore Studies at Indiana University, Bloomington.

He also serves as a Professorial Lecturer at the Department of Communication, De la Salle University and sits as Chairman of the AB Film Program at the Design and Arts Campus at the De La Salle-College of Saint Benilde.

He is also the Head of Competition and Monitoring Committee of the Cinemalaya Independent Film Festival.  He also sits as the Head of the Student Short Film Competition of the MetroManila Film Festival while sitting as part of its Education Panel.  there teaching under the Communication Department and holding classes for the Communication Arts majors of the university.

Awards

Metro Manila Film Festival

Filmography

Films

Director

Television

Writer

References

External links

1954 births
Living people
Filipino film directors
Filipino television directors
De La Salle University alumni
20th-century Filipino writers